Wuyishan (武夷山) can refer to the following locations in China:

 Wuyi Mountains, of northwestern Fujian
 Wuyishan Airport
 Wuyishan, Fujian, county-level city of Nanping
 Wuyishan, Jiangxi, town in Yanshan County
 Wuyishan National Nature Reserve, part of the Wuyi Mountains UNESCO World Heritage site; it includes:
 Fujian Wuyishan Biosphere Reserve, UNESCO Biosphere Reserve, in the Fujian portion of the Wuyi Mountains
 Jiangxi Wuyishan Biosphere Reserve, UNESCO Biosphere Reserve, in the Jiangxi portion of the Wuyi Mountains